The Anglican Service Book is an unofficial Anglican prayer book in traditional language which was first published in the United States in 1991. The book was compiled by a committee of priests, and published when David Moyer was rector of the Church of the Good Shepherd in Rosemont, Pennsylvania.

Overview

The book's foreword states that "The Anglican Service Book is a compilation of material from a number of sources focused around the structure of the 1979 Book of Common Prayer", a prayer book of the Episcopal Church in the United States. The other sources include the Anglican Missal, the Sarum Missal, and the Book of Occasional Services.

The book was published to facilitate worship in the traditional language of Anglicanism, as the 1979 Book of Common Prayer provided this option for only some services such as the daily offices, Holy Communion, and funerals. The 1979 BCP did not provide traditional language services for baptism, marriage, ordination, Compline, or other pastoral offices.

See also

Anglo-Catholicism

References

Sources

External links
The Anglican Service Book digitized by Richard Mammana

Anglican liturgy
Anglo-Catholicism
Missals
Anglican liturgical books